Georgios Athanasiadis (born 7 April 1993) is a Greek professional footballer who plays as a goalkeeper for Super League club AEK Athens.

Club career

Asteras Tripolis
On 29 June 2016, Asteras Tripolis officially announced the signing of Athanasiadis on a three-year deal.

AEK Athens
On 13 June 2019, AEK Athens confirmed the signing of the Greek goalkeeper, with his contract running until the summer of 2023.

Sheriff Tiraspol

On 18 June 2021, he was loaned to Sheriff Tiraspol until the summer of 2022. The Greek keeper had a vital contribution in the qualifying phase and play-off round, keeping six clean sheets in eight matches. In the qualifying phase, Athanasiadis made 21 saves and produced another man-of-the-match performance on 21 August against Dinamo Zagreb, keeping a clean sheet & making six crucial saves.

On 28 September 2021, in the second UEFA Champions League group stage match he performed impressively against Real Madrid, making 10 saves, producing one of the great Champions League shocks as the competition's least experienced club defeated the 13-time European champions at the Santiago Bernabéu Stadium. He was voted Man of the Match for his performance.

On 24 December 2021, Athanasiadis was named the best goalkeeper of the year in Moldova for his excellent performances with his club. In the league, he participated in 11 matches for Sheriff, recording an impressive nine clean sheets, while he played in 13 matches in the UEFA Champions League including the qualifying rounds. He was the goalkeeper with the most saves in the 2021–22 UEFA Champions League group stage with 29 saves.

International career
Athanasiadis was called up by the senior Greece side for the 2022–23 UEFA Nations League matches against Northern Ireland, Kosovo and Cyprus in June 2022.

Career statistics

Honours
Sheriff Tiraspol 
 Moldovan National Division: 2021–22
 Moldovan Cup: 2021–22

References

External links
 
 
 

1993 births
Living people
Greek footballers
Association football goalkeepers
Panthrakikos F.C. players
Asteras Tripolis F.C. players
AEK Athens F.C. players
Super League Greece players
FC Sheriff Tiraspol players
Moldovan Super Liga players
Greek expatriate footballers
Expatriate footballers in Moldova
Greek expatriate sportspeople in Moldova
Footballers from Kilkis